The Shoemaker River is an  river in the U.S. state of Virginia. It is a tributary of the North Fork Shenandoah River in Rockingham County, flowing along the western base of Little North Mountain. The river's elevation decreases about 230 feet from the source to the mouth.

See also
List of rivers of Virginia

References

USGS Hydrologic Unit Map - State of Virginia (1974)

Rivers of Virginia
Tributaries of the Shenandoah River
Rivers of Rockingham County, Virginia